William Sanderson Hume (18 December 1935 – 15 August 1990) was a Scottish professional footballer who played in the Scottish Football League for Dunfermline Athletic, St Mirren and Berwick Rangers, in the Football League, for Birmingham City, and in the Irish Football League and the Inter-Cities Fairs Cup for Glentoran. He played as a wing half or inside forward.

Career
Hume was born in Armadale, West Lothian. He played for nearby Seafield United and Whitburn before joining Dunfermline Athletic in 1955, for whom he made his Scottish League debut during the 1956–57 season. He played four Division One games, scoring once, and the next season played five Division Two games, again scoring once, and one game in the Scottish League Cup.

Despite interest from Rangers, Hume then came to England and signed for Birmingham City of the Football League First Division in February 1958, making his first-team debut in a friendly against Valencia. Unable to dislodge Dick Neal from the left-half position, Hume had to wait for his Football League debut until 18 March 1959, deputising for Neal in an away game against Leicester City which Birmingham won 4–2. He played eight league games in the 1959–60 season, succeeding Bunny Larkin at inside left, but scored only twice, and returned to Scotland in 1960.

Hume made a few appearances for St Mirren and for Berwick Rangers before trying his luck in Ireland, first with Bangor and then Glentoran. He scored for Glentoran in a Gold Cup final to earn himself a winners' medal, and represented the club in their first modern foray into European competition, the Inter-Cities Fairs Cup of 1962–63. Drawn to play Real Zaragoza, Glentoran lost the first leg 2–0, but took the lead in the away leg as Hume "swept [the ball] inside for Matt Doherty to volley it into the roof of the net", only to lose 6–2.

Returning to Scotland once more, Hume was briefly on the books of Alloa Athletic before becoming a player-coach in junior football, firstly for three years at Armadale Thistle and then at Bathgate Thistle.

Hume died in hospital in Livingston, West Lothian, in August 1990 at the age of 54.

References

External links

Photo of the 1954 team, including Hume, at Whitburn JFC's site (now via archive.org)

1935 births
1990 deaths
Footballers from West Lothian
Scottish footballers
Association football midfielders
Dunfermline Athletic F.C. players
Birmingham City F.C. players
St Mirren F.C. players
Berwick Rangers F.C. players
Bangor F.C. players
Glentoran F.C. players
Alloa Athletic F.C. players
Armadale Thistle F.C. players
Bathgate Thistle F.C. players
Scottish Football League players
English Football League players
NIFL Premiership players
Player-coaches
Whitburn Junior F.C. players
People from Armadale, West Lothian